The following is a list of notable people who have lived in Vancouver, Washington.

Notable people

 Mary Barnard, poet
 Greg Biffle, NASCAR driver
 Bob Bogle, guitarist and bassist for The Ventures
 Don Bonker, Congressman who resided in Vancouver while in office
 Jason V. Brock, filmmaker and writer
 Alina Cho, journalist
 Jordan Chiles, Olympic Gymnast 
 Westley Allan Dodd, American serial killer
 Tina Ellertson, soccer player
 Robert Franks, basketball player
 Linda Garcia, environmental activist
 Ulysses S. Grant, 18th President of the United States
 Garrett Grayson, National Football League player
 Tonya Harding, figure skater
 Seth Aaron Henderson, fashion designer
 Ed Herman, mixed martial artist
 Lars Larson, conservative talk show host
 Ron Larson, author and mathematician
 Maarty Leunen, basketball player
 Hugo McCord, preacher and biblical scholar
 Scott Mosier, film producer
 Randy Myers, baseball player
 Willie Nelson, singer 
 William F. Nolan, writer
 Val Ogden, politician 
 Chuck Palahniuk, writer
 Ricky Simon, mixed martial artist
 Greg Peach, Canadian Football League player
 Michael Roos, National Football League player 
 Isaac Scott, blues guitarist and singer
 Daniel Seavey, singer for Why Don't We
 Lon Simmons, sportscaster
 Tamina Snuka, professional wrestler
 Gerry Staley, baseball player
 Jack L. Tilley, 12th Sergeant Major of the Army
 Kathi Wilcox, musician
 Taylor Williams, baseball player
 Jeffrey C. Wynn, geophysicist
 Frances Yeend, concert and opera singer

See also
 List of people from Washington (state)

References

 
Vancouver, Washington
Vancouver